State Route 38 (SR 38) is a primary state highway in the U.S. state of Virginia.  Known for most of its length as Five Forks Road, SR 38 runs  from U.S. Route 360 Business (US 360 Business) in Amelia Court House east to SR 153 at Scotts Fork.

Route description

SR 38 begins at an intersection with US 360 Business (Goodes Bridge Road) in Amelia Court House. In Amelia, SR 38 makes a series of stairstep right-angle turns at the courthouse square: It heads south on Virginia Street, turns east onto Court Street, turns south onto Washington Street to follow the east side of the courthouse property, turns east onto Church Street, and turns south onto Five Forks Road, passing Amelia Academy. One mile south of Church Street, at Amelia County High School, SR 38 turns east, at a junction formerly called Five Forks. From this intersection, SR 614 runs northwest as Otterburn Road and south as Dennisville Road; and SR 38, still named Five Forks Road, heads east through countryside for 5.9 miles to SR 153 (Military Road) at Scotts Fork. Scotts Fork marks the eastern terminus of SR 38, but the roadway continues east as SR 602 (Bevils Bridge Road) into Chesterfield County toward Petersburg.

History
SR 38 follows a portion of the route taken by Confederate general Robert E. Lee and his army in their retreat westward during the final days of the Civil War. Confederate forces, hoping to reach a promised delivery of desperately needed rations at the Court House rail depot, had just fought an inconclusive battle at Namozine Church on April 3, 1865. Lee surrendered to Ulysses S. Grant at Appomattox on April 9.

All of SR 38, plus extensions east to Sutherland and northwest to Tobaccoville, was State Route 406 before the 1933 renumbering. At that time, SR 38 was assigned to the piece from Amelia Court House east to Sutherland; Amelia Court House to Tobaccoville became part of State Route 49. In the 1940 renumbering, SR 49 was greatly truncated, and SR 38 was extended northwest over former SR 49 to Tobaccoville.  SR 38 east of the south junction with SR 153, a section of "little primary significance", was transferred to the secondary system in 1951 as SR 708; the rest of SR 38 east of Amelia Court House became an extension of SR 153. However, later that year, SR 38 returned to the piece from Amelia Court House to the SR 153/SR 708 junction, and SR 153 was rerouted to go north from Scotts Fork. The overlap with SR 153 has since been removed.  The piece of SR 38 from Tobaccoville via Morven to Amelia Court House became SR 681 in 1954.

Major intersections

References

External links

Virginia Highways Project: VA 38

038
State Route 038